The southern river terrapin (Batagur affinis) is a turtle of the family Geoemydidae found in Malaysia, Indonesia and Cambodia.

Subspecies 
Batagur affinis affinis
Batagur affinis edwardmolli

Decline
Many Asian turtles are in danger because of the thriving trade in animals in the region, where a species' rarity can add to its value on a menu or as a traditional medicine.

The species was thought to have disappeared from Cambodia until it was rediscovered in 2001. Conservationists eventually began tagging the animals with tracking devices and monitoring their nests, and King Norodom Sihamoni personally ordered their protection. 
Its eggs were a delicacy of the royal cuisine of Cambodia. In 2005, it was designated the national reptile of Cambodia in an effort to bring awareness and conservation for this species. In July 2015, conservationists in Cambodia cautiously stated that efforts to bring back the species from the brink of extinction were having some success. A number of turtles, including breeding pairs,  have been moved from enclosed areas into their intended home, the rivers and shores of Koh Kong where, it is hoped – with the ongoing monitoring and protection of locals and conservationists – they will begin to flourish. They began their conservation effort by ensuring the safety of the hatchlings through fencing the nesting area of the species, given that the extremely low number of nests laid already. 

In Malaysia, rivers of Kedah, Perak and Terengganu are major nesting grounds though the population continues to crash despite conservation efforts undertaken by Malaysian Wildlife Department for over 20 years. Pasir Temir and Pasir Lubuk Kawah by the Terengganu River are the largest nesting sites for Batagur baska in the world.

See also
Northern river terrapin

References 

Bibliography

External links 
 Turtle Survival Alliance Blog – Southern River Terrapin (Batagur affinis)
 Turtle Conservation Society of Malaysia
 Satellites to Track Rare Royal Turtle in Cambodia (Video)

Batagur
Reptiles described in 1847